Michael Fitzgerald may refer to:

Arts 
Michael C. FitzGerald (born 1953), art historian and Picasso scholar
Michael G. Fitzgerald (1950–2006), American film historian and author
Michael J. Fitzgerald (writer) (born 1957), American writer
Michael O. Fitzgerald (born 1949), American author

Religion 
Michael J. Fitzgerald (bishop) (born 1948), American Catholic bishop
Michael Fitzgerald (cardinal) (born 1937), British Catholic cardinal

Sports 
Michael Fitzgerald (footballer) (born 1988), association football player for New Zealand
Michael Fitzgerald (hurler), Irish hurler
Michael Fitzgerald (rugby union) (born 1987), New Zealand rugby union footballer
Mick Fitzgerald (born 1970), Irish jockey

Other 
Michael Fitzgerald (Iowa politician) (born 1951), State Treasurer of Iowa
Michael Fitzgerald (Irish republican) (1881–1920), Irish Republican Army member, died on hunger strike
Michael Fitzgerald (psychiatrist), Irish psychiatrist and professor of child and adolescent psychiatry at Trinity College, Dublin
Michael W. Fitzgerald (born 1959), judge for the United States District Court for the Central District of California

See also
Mike Fitzgerald (disambiguation)